The Doom is a 1976 Romanian drama film directed by Sergiu Nicolaescu. The film was entered into the 10th Moscow International Film Festival where Amza Pellea won the award for Best Actor. The film was also selected as the Romanian entry for the Best Foreign Language Film at the 49th Academy Awards, but was not accepted as a nominee.

Plot
Peasant Manolache Preda returns to his village after an absence of twelve years. After serving ten years in the salt mines as punishment for killing the local landowner during a peasant's revolt, he served two years in the army, fighting in WW1. On his return he finds his wife has sold his land to the nephew of the landowner he killed and has taken up with another man. Shunned by other villagers, he finds work with the Boyar, the landowner, but when the Boyar is killed by local bandits he runs for his life, fearing he will be blamed.

Cast
 Amza Pellea as taranul Manolache Preda
 Ernest Maftei as cantonierul Sava Petrache
 Gheorghe Dinică as Ion, Seful de Post de Jandarmi
 Ioana Pavelescu as taranca Ruxsandra
 Sergiu Nicolaescu as Procurorul Tudor Marin
 Emmerich Schäffer as Boierul Leon Paraianu
 Mihai Mereuta as Plutonierul Bobinca
 Aimée Iacobescu as Magda Paraianu

See also
 List of submissions to the 49th Academy Awards for Best Foreign Language Film
 List of Romanian submissions for the Academy Award for Best Foreign Language Film

References

External links
 

1976 films
1976 drama films
1970s Romanian-language films
Films directed by Sergiu Nicolaescu
Romanian drama films
Films set in 1919